Curtis L. Frazier (born March 11, 1945) is a former American football cornerback who played one season for the Cincinnati Bengals in 1968. He also played for the Sacramento Buccaneers of the Continental Football League in 1967.

References

Living people
1945 births
American football cornerbacks
Contra Costa Comets football players
Fresno State Bulldogs football players
Cincinnati Bengals players
Continental Football League players
Players of American football from Berkeley, California